9 is the second studio album by Irish singer, songwriter and producer Damien Rice, released in 2006. The album was released on 3 November in Ireland, 6 November in the United Kingdom and 14 November in the US. It was followed by the single "9 Crimes", which was released on 27 November 2006. The record was certified gold in the UK.

Background
Damien Rice had originally intended to record only one album, O, but he ended up releasing 9 at the insistence of his record company. He later said in an interview: "Now I regret that, because I would take half the songs that are on 9 off. I just don't think it's as good a record as it could be".

"Elephant" was originally titled "The Blower's Daughter Part 2". "The Blower's Daughter" is a song on Rice's first album O.

Critical reaction

The album was released to mixed critical and fan reaction. NME gave the album 4/10, describing it as "IKEA rock". Hot Press wrote "If Rice really was a nervous wounded-wing, there's no way he'd skirt as close to Nick Drake comparisons as he does on 'The Animals Are Gone'", and, in a reference to the 'noise' preceding the first track, "there's another noise that can be made out faintly but distinctly – the sound of the Grays, LaMontagnes, Johnsons and the Blunts of this world breaking their pencil tips on their jotters in sheer envy and frustration."

Both Mojo and Q gave the album 4/5. The Sunday Times'' made it their 'Album of the Week'. It was People's Critic Choice in November 2006.

Sales chart performance
The album reached number 4 in the UK Albums Chart. In the US, it was on the Billboard 200 for 10 weeks, peaking on its debut at #22.

Track listing

Personnel
 Daisy – drawing, painting
 Shane Fitzsimons – bass, double bass
 Lisa Hannigan – backing vocals
 Vyvienne Long – cello
 Cora Venus Lunny – viola, violin
 Tom Osander – drums, glasses
 Damien Rice – clarinet, Fender Rhodes, guitar, percussion, piano, production, singing bowls, vocals, wurlitzer
 Joel Shearer – electric guitar

Charts

Weekly charts

Year-end charts

References

 
 

2006 albums
Damien Rice albums
Vector Recordings albums